Marios Elia (born 19 May 1996) is a Cypriot professional footballer who plays as a forward for Cypriot First Division club APOEL on loan from Ethnikos Achna and the Cyprus national team.

Club statistics

International goals
Scores and results list Cyprus' goal tally first.

References

External links

1996 births
Living people
Cypriot footballers
Cypriot First Division players
Cyprus under-21 international footballers
Cyprus international footballers
Ethnikos Achna FC players
AEL Limassol players
Alki Oroklini players
Association football forwards